Ocadiatrematidae is a family of trematodes belonging to the order Plagiorchiida.

Genera:
 Ocadiatrema Fischthal & Kuntz, 1981

References

Plagiorchiida